Erfan Pourafzar ; is an Iranian footballer  who currently plays for Iranian football club Khooshe Talaei in the Azadegan League.

Club career

Paykan
Aghakhan joined Paykan in summer 2013. He made his debut for Paykan on November 10, 2013 against Iranjavan as a starter. He scored his first goal for Paykan in his 2nd appearance for them against Badr Bandar Kong.

Club career statistics

References

External links
 http://socialsport.ir/People/178802118
https://web.archive.org/web/20151125195319/http://www.persianleague.com/index.php/teams?id=3598&view=player

1991 births
Living people
Iranian footballers
Esteghlal F.C. players
Paykan F.C. players
Khooshe Talaei players
Sportspeople from Tehran
Association football forwards